Chiloglanis reticulatus is a species of upside-down catfish native to the Dja River system in Cameroon and the Luala and Lufu River drainages in the Democratic Republic of the Congo.  This species grows to a length of  SL.

References

External links 

reticulatus
Freshwater fish of Africa
Fish of Cameroon
Fish of the Democratic Republic of the Congo
Fish described in 1989